The tenth and final season of the American television sitcom Roseanne follows the Conners, a working-class family, struggling to get by on a limited household income in their home at 714 Delaware Street in the drab fictional mid-state exurb of Lanford, Illinois. The season was produced by Carsey-Werner Television, with Roseanne Barr, Bruce Helford, Whitney Cummings, Sara Gilbert, Tom Werner, and Tony Hernandez serving as executive producers.

Barr starred as Roseanne Conner, while John Goodman played Dan Conner. They were joined by principal cast members Laurie Metcalf, Gilbert, Lecy Goranson, and Michael Fishman, who reprised their roles from the previous seasons, with Emma Kenney, Ames McNamara, and Jayden Rey joining them. Development on a revival of Roseanne series, with Barr, Goodman, and Gilbert. ABC ordered a tenth season revival of the series, consisting of eight episodes, set to air as a mid-season replacement during the 2017–18 television season, with the original cast. Production on the season began in October 2017. An additional episode was ordered in November 2017.

The season premiere was watched by 18.44 million viewers and had a 5.2 rating in the 18–49 demographic, the highest rated Tuesday entertainment telecast in six years among adults 18–49, and television's highest rated comedy telecast on any night in 3.5 years, since The Big Bang Theory in September 2014. The season, which began airing on ABC on March 27, 2018, has received generally positive reviews from critics. The series was renewed for an eleventh season on March 30, 2018, just three days after the season premiere, but the series was subsequently cancelled by ABC on May 29, 2018, following Barr's remarks made on Twitter about Valerie Jarrett, a former advisor to President Barack Obama. It was followed by the first season of The Conners a direct continuation of season 10- which, importantly- excluded Barr.

Cast and characters

Main
 Roseanne Barr as Roseanne Conner
 John Goodman as Dan Conner
 Laurie Metcalf as Jackie Harris
 Sara Gilbert as Darlene Conner
 Lecy Goranson as Becky Conner-Healy
 Michael Fishman as D.J. Conner
 Emma Kenney as Harris Conner-Healy
 Ames McNamara as Mark Conner-Healy
 Jayden Rey as Mary Conner

Guest
 Sarah Chalke as Andrea 
 Judy Prescott as Miss Crane 
 Estelle Parsons as Beverly Harris
 Sandra Bernhard as Nancy Bartlett
 Natalie West as Crystal Anderson
 Adilah Barnes as Anne Marie Mitchell
 Johnny Galecki as David Healy
 Christopher Lloyd as Lou
 James Pickens, Jr. as Chuck Mitchell

Episodes

Production

Development
During Roseannes ninth season, Roseanne Barr was in negotiations with Carsey-Werner Productions to continue playing Roseanne Conner in a spin-off. ABC, which had an option on the spinoff, initially expressed interest but withdrew from negotiations due to the high cost, with a different network poised to pick up the project. However, after failed discussions with CBS and Fox, Barr and Carsey-Werner agreed "to call it a day" and discontinue the negotiations for the spinoff. In the fall of 2008, Barr commented on what the current whereabouts of the Conners would be, saying "I've always said now that if they were on TV, DJ would have been killed in Iraq and [the Conners] would have lost their house." She refused to reveal any more information on the rest of the Conners in the hope that it "may be developed later". In December 2009, Barr posted an entry on her website regarding what a possible Roseanne reunion would be like, which included: DJ getting published, Mark dying in Iraq; David leaving Darlene for a woman half his age, Darlene coming out and meeting a woman and having a test tube baby with her, Roseanne and Jackie opening the first medical marijuana dispensary in Lanford, Dan reappearing alive after faking his death [in the series finale], and Bonnie being arrested for selling crack.

In April 2017, reports circulated that an eight-episode revival of the series was being shopped to multiple networks including ABC and Netflix, spearheaded by Sara Gilbert with Roseanne Barr and John Goodman set to reprise their roles alongside Gilbert. On May 16, 2017, ABC announced that Roseanne would return for an eight-episode tenth season set to air as a mid-season replacement during the 2017–18 television season. An additional episode was ordered on November 13, 2017, bringing the total for the season to nine episodes.

Casting
Main cast members Roseanne Barr, John Goodman, Laurie Metcalf, Lecy Goranson, Sara Gilbert and Michael Fishman return from previous seasons as Roseanne Conner, Dan Conner, Jackie Harris, Becky Conner-Healy, Darlene Conner, and D.J. Conner, respectively. In September 2017, Ames McNamara was announced to be cast as Mark Conner-Healy, Darlene and David's 8-year-old son; while Emma Kenney was cast as Harris Conner-Healy, David and Darlene's teenage daughter. Jayden Rey joined the cast in October as Mary Conner, D.J.'s daughter. Sarah Chalke, who played Becky during the later seasons of the series, appears as Andrea, a married woman who hires Becky to be her surrogate. Also returning from earlier in the series are Judy Prescott as Miss Crane, Estelle Parsons as Beverly Harris, Sandra Bernhard as Nancy Bartlett, Natalie West as Crystal Anderson, James Pickens, Jr. as Chuck Mitchell, Adilah Barnes as Anne Marie Mitchell, and Johnny Galecki as David Healy. In December 2017, it was announced that Christopher Lloyd would guest star in the revival as a love interest of Parsons' character Beverly.

Filming
Production on the season began on October 17, 2017, and concluded on December 15, in Studio City, Los Angeles.

Release

Broadcast
The season began airing on March 27, 2018, on ABC in the United States, and on CTV in Canada.

Marketing
The first trailer for the season premiered during the 90th Academy Awards on March 4, 2018, which Emily Longeretta for Us Weekly commented that "the comedy wasted no time when it came to cracking jokes about its ending." Shane Lou at Today said the message of the trailer was clear: "Nothing has changed,... it's the same Roseanne, right down to her unmistakable laugh."

To promote the return of the series, ABC partnered with NASCAR to sponsor the NASCAR Xfinity Series race at Auto Club Speedway in Fontana, California and rename it the "Roseanne 300". Branding appeared throughout the track, including the pace car, infield grass logo, and in the victory lane, with Michael Fishman serving as grand marshal.

Reception

Critical response
The review aggregator website Rotten Tomatoes reported a 70% approval rating for the tenth season, based on 79 reviews, with an average rating of 6.72/10. The website's critical consensus reads, "Roseannes return finds the show's classic format, original cast, and timely humor intact, even if the latest batch of episodes suffers from sporadically uneven execution." Metacritic, which uses a weighted average, assigned a score of 69 out of 100 based on 31 critics, indicating "generally favorable reviews".

Ratings
After one day of DVR viewing, the premiere grew by 3.4 million viewers to a total of 21.87 million, and its 18-49 rating increased by a full point to a 6.2. After three days of DVR viewing, the premiere grew by 6.7 million viewers to a total of 25.04 million, setting a three-day DVR viewership record. The 18-49 rating also grew by 2.1, rising to a 7.3, the largest three-day DVR demo increase since 2015.

References

External links
 
 

2018 American television seasons
10
Television controversies in the United States
2018 controversies
2018 controversies in the United States
Obscenity controversies in television